Major General Hugo Douglas de Pree,  (25 December 1870 – 30 March 1943) was a British Army officer who served as Commandant of the Royal Military Academy, Woolwich.

Military career
Educated at Eton College and the Royal Military Academy, Woolwich, de Pree was commissioned as a second lieutenant in the Royal Artillery on 25 July 1890. He was promoted to lieutenant on 25 July 1893, and served on the North West Frontier of India in 1897. Promotion to captain followed on 3 February 1900, when he was divisional adjutant at Royal Artillery Barracks at Woolwich. After the outbreak of the Second Boer War in South Africa, he volunteered for service with the Imperial Yeomanry. He served originally with the 17th Battalion, but was on 3 May 1902 appointed second-in-command of the 7th Battalion, with the temporary rank of major. He relinquished his appointment with the Imperial Yeomanry on 5 September 1902, and returned to the Royal Horse Artillery to be stationed at Secunderabad.

De Pree later served in the First World War. He was appointed Commander of the 13th Indian Infantry Brigade in 1920, General Officer Commanding 55th (West Lancashire) Division in 1925 and Commandant of the Royal Military Academy, Woolwich in 1926, before retiring in 1931.

He lived at Beckley in East Sussex where there is a memorial to de Pree at All Saints' Church.

Family
Pree married firstly Diones Thornhill; they had three sons and one daughter. He later married Mary Fisher.

References

|-

1870 births
1943 deaths
British Army major generals
People from Brome, Suffolk
British Army personnel of the Second Boer War
British Army generals of World War I
Commandants of the Royal Military Academy, Woolwich
Companions of the Order of the Bath
Companions of the Order of St Michael and St George
Companions of the Distinguished Service Order
People educated at Eton College
Royal Artillery officers
People from Beckley, East Sussex
Graduates of the Royal Military Academy, Woolwich
Military personnel of British India